Arthur Preston Aylesworth (August 12, 1883 – June 26, 1946) was an American stage and film actor.

Early years
Aylesworth was born in Apponaug, Rhode Island, to a military family; his father and his grandfather graduated from the United States Military Academy. Aylesworth himself attended the academy for two years.

Career
Aylesworth's Broadway debut came in Over Night (1911). His other Broadway appearances included the musical Follow Thru (1929), and his last show there was Yankee Point (1942). He was on the stage for over a quarter of a century and acted in many productions. In the 1930s, he became a contract player at Warner Brothers working in character actors, often uncredited. Aylesworth played in over 130 films almost exclusively from the early 1930s onwards. His grave is located at Chapel of the Pines Crematory in Los Angeles.

Selected filmography

 Over Night (1915)
 The Key (1934)
 Midnight Alibi (1934)
 The Dragon Murder Case (1934)
 British Agent (1934)
 The Case of the Howling Dog (1934)
 Gentlemen Are Born (1934)
 I Am a Thief (1934)
 6 Day Bike Rider (1934)
 Babbitt (1934)
 The Secret Bride (1934)
 Show Kids (1935 Vitaphone short)
 The Nitwits (1935)
 King of the Pecos (1936)
 The Plot Thickens (1936)
 Too Many Wives (1937)
 I Cover the War (1937)
 Fifty Roads to Town (1937)
 Marry the Girl (1937)
 Slave Ship (1937)
 Of Human Hearts (1938)
 The Strange Case of Dr. Meade (1938)
 Test Pilot (1938) as Mr. Frank Barton
 Jesse James (1939)
 King of the Underworld (1939) as Dr. Sanders
 6,000 Enemies (1939)
 The Oklahoma Kid (1939) as Judge Morgan
 The Return of Doctor X (1939) as Guide
 Dangerously They Live (1941)
 Sin Town (1942)
 Moontide (1942)
 Crime Doctor's Warning (1945)

References

External links

American male film actors
American male stage actors
1883 births
1946 deaths
20th-century American male actors
Burials at Chapel of the Pines Crematory